is the main protagonist of Capcom's Mega Man X video game series, known as  in Japan. First appearing in the 1993 Super NES video game Mega Man X, X is an android member of the Maverick Hunters, a special police force tasked for defending humans and Reploids (anthropomorphic androids similar to X) against criminal Reploids known as Mavericks. X has appeared in multiple printed adaptations of the series as well as an original video animation, Day of Sigma, which explores his early days as a hunter. X is also a supporting character in the Mega Man Zero and Mega Man ZX video game series, which star his Maverick Hunter comrade Zero. Outside of the main Mega Man franchise, X has appeared in multiple crossover video games series.

X was created by Keiji Inafune as a successor to the original Mega Man. He was given a darker characterization and multiple sets of armor that enhanced his skills to contrast him from his predecessor. Besides Inafune, X was overseen by artist Hayato Kaji. The character has been voiced by multiple actors in both Japanese and English versions of the franchise.

Critical reaction to X has been generally positive, with game journalists often finding him a worthy successor to Mega Man based on his unique traits. His partnership with Zero was also praised due to their different and complementary skills, although X was noted as being less popular than Zero, and his English voice actors were often seen as unfit for his characterization.

Creation and development

Original concept

When the NES began being overshadowed by its successor, the Super NES, Capcom designer Keiji Inafune embraced the improved graphics engine and developed a darker plot and character design to the original Mega Man franchise. Inafune felt that the original title character was too good and that his successor should have an "edge". In line with the new "X" series developed, two characters were created: one being the main character, X, and the other his partner, Zero. In the original Mega Man series, Inafune usually designed the protagonist while his protégé Hayato Kaji handled the supporting characters; however, their roles were reversed for Mega Man X. Kaji (credited as Rippa H.K) illustrated the protagonist X but had a difficult time with the initial design. However, he was then presented with much more freedom than he was accustomed to, due to the SNES's larger palette of colors when compared to the NES.

Inafune and Kaji worked simultaneously on various designs for X with different pieces of armor attached. The idea for the armor parts came about because the game was planned during a time when role-playing video games were becoming extremely popular. Inafune felt that Mega Man had always represented a classic action game formula where the hero earns his defeated enemies' abilities; the armor parts were added to supplement this concept. Inafune created the character Zero, whom he originally intended to be the game's main, playable protagonist. "When the X series came out, I really wanted to redesign Mega Man," Inafune explained. "I wanted a totally different Mega Man. I’m a designer, a creator; I wanted something new. I didn’t want to use the same old Mega Man." Fearing a negative reaction from fans, Zero was ultimately reduced to a role secondary to X. Inafune noted that in early sketches, X and Zero were too similar, so Capcom aimed to make their silhouettes contrast one another due to make the merchandise easier to distinguish. Early illustrations of X made him look like a "cold-blooded killer", which led artists to soften his features in later games.

Since the series' beginning, character designer Haruki Suetsugu was impressed by the handling of the relationship between X and Zero. From his point of view, X was a character who often makes mistakes in combat and constantly tries to improve. As a result, the artist felt he could relate with X, who was written to be a "B class" Hunter in contrast to Zero being the superior "Special A" rank. This allowed him to draw more frequently across the series. Suetsugu replaced Inafune as designer starting in the fourth game. Nevertheless, he regretted some of his illustrations as X lacked the appeal that Zero originally had.

Development and designs

For the fourth title, Hitoshi Ariga was responsible for designing X's secret  featured in both the game after inputting a cheat code and as a Japanese Bandai action figure. He spent four days coming up with the initial blueprint, but was told by his supervisor to revise it. After tinkering with the Mega Man X3 armor parts, he noticed that attaching them in specific ways made them look like an airplane. Ariga remembered creating the armor as an extremely difficult yet fun task. He also revealed that Zero was intended to have his own Ultimate Armor, but the development team chose to not finalize it. X's new  was designed by Ryuji Higurashi for X5, who wanted it to resemble a bird with a beak-shaped chest piece, wings coming out of the back, and a talon-like arm cannon. Suetsugu designed the Gaea Armor, which was meant to resemble Sanagiman from the Inazuman manga series. In Mega Man X6, Suetsugu aimed to make the Blade and Shadow Armors look stylish.

The cover art for the Japanese Saturn version of X4 depicts Zero standing alone in a dark setting. "Usually, not having the main character on the package would be unheard of," Inafune stated. "But we had a lot of hardcore fans on the Saturn, so I figured it would be all right." A "Special Limited Pack" edition of the game included the Ultimate Armor X action figure. Another armor based on the Ultimate's design was made for X to wear in the Mega Man X collection's Challenge Mode. The three main characters were revised for Mega Man X8 as Yoshikawa planned to give them more unique features.

For Mega Man X: Command Mission, Assistant Producer Tatsuya Kitabayashi claimed the staff were fans of the main character and wanted to alter his design. This was mostly because Capcom felt X looked too simple. The Hyper Mode was exclusive to the playable characters X and Zero. However, because this gave them too large of an advantage over other party members, all other characters were given one Hyper Mode while X and Zero were given two each. The staff noted X's overall characterization was conflicted due to his pacifist nature while killing enemies. As a result, they decided to make a strong yet kind character in order to appeal to the fans, turning him "into a full-fledged hero". Nevertheless, the developers were afraid of a negative backlash if the fans found X and Zero to be too different from their original personas. The redesign involved a "beam scarf" that could be produced whenever X performed a dash.

Mega Man Zeros main antagonist was a popular topic of discussion during production, and the developer often sought input from Capcom in this regard. Yoshihisa Tsuda jokingly suggested that they make the original X the game's final boss, an idea that was accepted at first. According to director Ryota Ito, Inti Creates realized that it "wouldn't sit so well with the young boys and girls that really do see [X] as a hero", so they replaced him with Copy X just one month before release.

X and Zero were intended to appear in the cancelled game Maverick Hunter. Both X and Zero would have featured alongside a new human sidekick who is a "Bruce Willis-like police officer." The inclusion of the human sidekick was part of the game's "man versus machine contrast". It was to be the first of a trilogy of games; players would control X in the first two games while they would switch to Zero in the third game, who must destroy X (who had become "incredibly powerful and infinitely intelligent over the course of two games").

Voice actors

X was first voiced in Japanese by Megumi Ogata, who considered the role to be a "first generation part" of her career alongside other series like Yu-Gi-Oh! due to voicing X and Yugi Mutou in their first appearance and later being replaced. Starting in Mega Man X4, X was given another voice actor, Kentarō Itō. He was replaced by Showtaro Morikubo for the next works. The fourth voice actor currently voicing X since Mega Man X8 is Takahiro Sakurai, who said he enjoyed voicing X across the crossover Project X Zone as he remembered X's thoughts. Sakurai described X as a serious character who "hesitates and agonizes, but always keeps fighting. He recalls experiencing multiple sad feelings when acting as X. He is always fighting, not just against Mavericks but also his inner persona as while does not enjoy the chaos, he finds himself forced to fight to achieve peace. Similar to his experience when playing the Mega Man X games from the Super NES he looked forward to the crossover due to his interactions with other famous characters." X from the Mega Man Zero and ZX series is voiced by Takahiro Mizushima.

In the English dub, X was given multiple voice actors starting with Michael Donovan in a crossover special, partnering up with the original Mega Man in the 1994 Ruby-Spears series. Ruth Marie Jarman (credited as Ruth Shiraishi), who also voiced Mega Man in Mega Man 8, voiced X in Mega Man X4. Peter von Gomm voiced him in Mega Man X7. Mark Gatha replaced him in the next game, the first title's remake and the original video animation, Day of Sigma. Ted Sroka worked as X for the fighting game Marvel vs. Capcom Infinite, expressing joy when his role was revealed.

Appearances

In the Mega Man X series
In the original game Mega Man X, X was created by Dr. Thomas Light sometime in "20XX" and is the template on which all non-Light model mechanical beings known as Reploids are based. Light named him X after the variable "x" which, in algebraic terms, represents limitless possibility, like X's advanced systems. Light died before X's diagnostics were complete, and X was discovered in his capsule 100 years later by another scientist, Dr. Cain, who attempted to emulate X's technology and produced the first mass-produced Reploids: humanoid androids based on X's designs. Under Sigma's leadership, the Maverick Hunters were formed to combat them. However, Sigma becomes a Maverick and leads a massive revolt. X decides to stop Sigma, and teams up with Zero, one of the last remaining Hunters. The original video animation, The Day of Sigma, retells these events before the game begins.

In the first game of the series, Mega Man X, X is defeated by the Maverick Vile but is rescued by Zero. In the game, X faces multiple Mavericks and reaches Sigma after defeating Vile with Zero's aid. After X defeats Sigma, he continues searching for Mavericks in order to achieve peace. He and Zero also appear as bosses in the game's remake, Maverick Hunter X if the player unlocks Vile. X's constant struggles in regard to defeating new Mavericks cause him to wonder if he is destined to be Zero's enemy fearing the possibility that he himself might be going Maverick in his ending from Mega Man X4 after a battle with the Repliforce military. By Mega Man X5, X can appear as a boss character in the final stages if the player uses Zero after he is infected by Sigma. While X continues facing Reploids that have become Mavericks as a result of a virus in Mega Man X6, he becomes reluctant to continue his missions in Mega Man X7 until he fears Red Alert's forces might result in more casualties. In the latest main title, Mega Man X8, X is playable alongside Zero and Axl who are shocked when they discover that all Reploids will become copies of Sigma in the future; as a result, they fear that the war will never end.

X also appears in the spin-offs Mega Man Xtreme to fight Mavericks and partners with a computer genius named Middy, and Mega Man Xtreme 2 to fight against a "Soul Eraser" named Berkana who plans to resurrect a growing army of undead Mavericks from the past. In Mega Man X: Command Mission, X leads a resistance team to defeat the minions of the Rebellion Army. A mobile phone game also has X as a playable character. Although Mega Man X8 was released by the time of the mobile game, Capcom chose X's previous look due to it being more well-known.

X also reprises his role from the first game in three mangas by Iwamoto Yoshihiro, and the prequel Irregular Maverick Hunter X by Ikehara Shigeto. Yoshihiro also wrote an alternative ending to Mega Man X5 where Zero temporarily kills X after being consumed by his dark persona only to be driven by guilt and has him repaired by combining their bodies. A Brazilian comic was also written where the cast often breaks the fourth wall.

Other appearances
Outside of Mega Man X, X is present in the sequel series Mega Man Zero. Zero suffers from amnesia and believes that his friend X has conquered the world until a scientist named Ciel reveals he is a copy she created. The real X appears in the ending and, having tired of fighting, asks Zero to take his place on the battlefield. In the direct sequel, X's body is destroyed by Elpizo, but his mind remains active until he fades away in Mega Man Zero 3.

X appeared in the Mega Man episode "Mega X" and was voiced by Michael Donovan. He follows Vile and Spark Mandrill to the present to stop them from taking Lightanium back to their own time to help Sigma finance his wars against humans. Like Mega Man, X has the ability to copy weapons from enemies by touching them, such as using Snake Man's weapon to destroy Dr. Wily's plasma cannon.

An X outfit can be unlocked and worn by the character Frank West in Dead Rising, who also uses it as part of his hyper combo in Tatsunoko vs. Capcom: Ultimate All Stars. X appears in Ultimate Marvel vs. Capcom 3 as a DLC costume for both Frank and Zero and as a cameo appearance in Zero's ending. X also appears in Super Smash Bros. for Nintendo 3DS/Wii U and Super Smash Bros. Ultimate as part of Mega Man's Final Smash. Mii Gunners also have access to X's armor through paid DLC in both versions of 3DS/Wii U and Ultimate. X is also seen with Zero in Project X Zone and its sequel.  X is a playable character in Marvel vs. Capcom: Infinite and Puzzle Fighter with his Command Mission design as an alternate skin. He also appears in the card game Teppen.

X also makes guest appearances in the Mega Man comic series by Archie Comics, appearing in stories set shortly before the events of Mega Man X and as part of the "Worlds Unite" crossover event. Writers noted multiple fans sent them messages about the character prior to his introduction, but that they wanted to see X portrayed as a darker character. However, they aimed not to take the Command Mission incarnation which depicted X as more of a leader.

Reception

The initial reaction to X has been positive. The media found him as a worthy successor to the original Mega Man based on his own skills, design but more significant storyline. In the book 100 Greatest Video Game Franchises,  X's innocence that contrasts the violent battlefield he is always put into the video game game was also compared with heroes from Hayao Miyazaki's works as well as dystopian works in general like Ghost in the Shell and Casshan. In retrospect, IGN  enjoyed the idea of him being able to perform a special move from the Street Fighter fighting game series also developed by Capcom. Several sites criticized his child-like voice from Mega Man X4 as a poor fit with his character. His lack of early inclusion in Mega Man X7 led to negative response. However, Destructoid felt that Mega Man X8 improved in this regard, as X returns as a playable character. GameFan praised the new armor design provided for Mega Man X2, finding it more visually appealing than the original.Game Informer claimed X had the best weaponry in his introduction and that if Capcom were to make another Mega Man X, X's weaponry should be based on it. It also considered X's armors from X6, such as the Shadow and Falcon Armors, to be the best ones in the series. 

Journalist also commented on X's appearances from spin-offs from the Mega Man X series. When comparing their fighting styles in Mega Man Xtreme 2, GameSpot found X more enjoyable than Zero due tot he former's multiple special attacks with Nintendo Life agreeing that X's moves are easier to perform. In regards to Command Mission, X was praised by GameSpy due to the series giving him a more elaborated storyline and characterized him as a veteran. RPGFan also regarded X as one of the best-written characters in this title. However, Nintendo World Report was disappointed by X losing his trademark ability in this game of copying weapons, which is given to Axl. There was also commentary on X's voice actor Mark Gatha who is prominent when the protagonist interacts with bosses. Gatha was criticized for always sounding angry.  Moreover, RPGFan considered X's voice unfitting and compared it to a boy scout's voice. Clint Mize wrote an article for MTV's gaming section detailing why the cancelled Maverick Hunter was a terrible could have turned off "core fans" of the Mega Man X series and that X required a "solid core title to reintroduce the character" rather than a "dark reimagining". 

There were also comments focused on the character outside the franchise. GamesRadar considered both X and Zero as "crossover veterans" based on their multiple appearances and looked forward to when they joined forces for the first time in Project X Zone. Kyle Hilliard from Game Informer considered X and Zero as one of his favorite characters in gaming and wanted to play as them in the sequel Project X Zone 2. However, when compared with Zero, X was found as the less interesting character as his comrade stands out more as a break out character.  Zero was chosen to represent the "Mega Man" franchise over Mega Man or X himself in Marvel vs. Capcom 3, as director Ryota Niitsuma thought he had more variation in his moves. For Infinite, X was added due to his large popularity within the Western audience.  X's addition to the Marvel vs. Capcom Infinite cast has proven to be popular according to Polygon. However, the writer noted that despite fans' excitement with X's inclusion, many were displeased with his early defeat in a preview.

References
General

Specific

Capcom protagonists
Cryonically preserved characters in video games
Robot characters in video games
Robot superheroes
Male characters in video games
Mega Man characters
Video game characters with superhuman strength
Video game characters who can move at superhuman speeds
Video game characters who can teleport
Video game characters introduced in 1993
Video game bosses
Video game superheroes